The 1985 Australian Endurance Championship was a CAMS sanctioned motor racing title for drivers of Touring Cars complying with an Australian version of FIA Group A Touring Car regulations. The championship was the fifth Australian Endurance Championship and the fourth to be awarded as a drivers title.

Calendar

The championship was contested over a five-round series which was staged concurrently with the 1985 Australian Manufacturers' Championship.

Class Structure
Cars were grouped into three classes based on engine capacity: 
 Up to 2000cc
 2001 to 3000cc
 3001 to 6000cc

Points system
Championship points were allocated on a three scale system, to Australian license holders only, for outright places gained in each round:
 Scale A was applied to drivers of cars in the Up to 2000cc class
 Scale B was applied to drivers of cars in the 2001 to 3000cc class
 Scale C was applied to drivers of cars in the 3001 to 6000cc class

In rounds where two drivers were compulsory (i.e. the Sandown and Bathurst rounds), full championship points were allocated to each of the two drivers provided that both had driven at least one third of the relevant distance.
In all other rounds, where two drivers were not compulsory, points were allocated to each of the two drivers provided each had driven at least one third of the distance. If each had not driven such a distance, full points were allocated to the driver who had driven the greater distance.
In all cases, points were only awarded to a driver who had driven one single car throughout the duration of the event.

Results

Note: Only the top ten pointscorers are shown in the above table.

References

Further reading
 Official Programme, Sandown International Motor Racing Circuit, 14 and 15 September 1985

External links
 Images from 1985 Australian Touring Car racing Retrieved from www.autopics.com.au on 17 July 2009
 Images from the Bathurst round of the 1985 Australian Endurance Championship Retrieved from www.autopics.com.au on 17 July 2009

Australian Endurance Championship
Endurance Championship